Louis Napoleon may refer to:

 Louis Bonaparte or Louis Napoléon Bonaparte, (1778–1846), King Louis I of Holland, brother of Napoleon I
 Napoléon Louis Bonaparte (1804–1831), King Louis II of Holland, second son of Louis Bonaparte (1778–1846)
 Napoléon Eugène, Prince Imperial or Napoléon IV, Prince Imperial, often referred to as Louis Napoléon (1856–1879), only child of Napoleon III
 Prince Louis Napoléon or Napoléon VI, Prince Imperial, (1914–1997), pretender to the French throne
 Louis-Napoleon Bonaparte or Napoleon III (1808–1873), Emperor of France 1852–1870
 Louis Napoleon (underground railroad), associate of Sydney Howard Gay